Radio Data System (RDS) is a communications protocol standard for embedding small amounts of digital information in conventional FM radio broadcasts. RDS standardizes several types of information transmitted, including time, station identification and program information.

The standard began as a project of the European Broadcasting Union (EBU), but has since become an international standard of the International Electrotechnical Commission (IEC). Radio Broadcast Data System (RBDS) is the official name used for the U.S. version of RDS. The two standards are only slightly different, with receivers able to work with either system and only minor inconsistencies in the displayed data.

Both versions carry data at 1,187.5 bits per second on a 57 kHz subcarrier, so there are exactly 48 cycles of subcarrier during every data bit. The RBDS/RDS subcarrier was set to the third harmonic of the 19 kHz FM stereo pilot tone to minimize interference and intermodulation between the data signal, the stereo pilot and the 38 kHz DSB-SC stereo difference signal. (The stereo difference signal extends up 38 kHz + 15 kHz = 53 kHz, leaving 4 kHz for the lower sideband of the RDS signal.)

The data is sent with an error correction code, but receivers may choose to use it only for error detection purposes. RDS defines many features including how private (in-house) or other undefined features can be "packaged" in unused program groups.

Development
RDS was inspired by the development of the Autofahrer-Rundfunk-Informationssystem (ARI) in Germany by the Institut für Rundfunktechnik (IRT) and the radio manufacturer Blaupunkt. ARI used a 57-kHz subcarrier to indicate the presence of traffic information in an FM radio broadcast.

The EBU Technical Committee launched a project at its 1974 Paris meeting to develop a technology with similar purposes to ARI, but which was more flexible and which would enable automated retuning of a receiver where a broadcast network transmitted the same radio programme on a number of different frequencies. The modulation system was based on that used in a Swedish paging system and the baseband coding was a new design, mainly developed by the British Broadcasting Corporation (BBC) and the IRT. The EBU issued the first RDS specification in 1984.

Of the three broadcasting partners of the EBU, the BBC were reportedly pursuing the application of RDS technology most enthusiastically and sought to attract bids from manufacturers to make a "BBC-accredited radio" supporting RDS features. Having received no manufacturer interest, however, the corporation engaged designers at Kinneir Dufort to produce a prototype showcasing these features. This prototype, unveiled in 1989, incorporated a liquid-crystal display capable of showing images such as weather maps, accompanied by "a light pen with which the radio can be programmed from barcodes", these barcodes encoding programme information, and supported detachable modules, of which a cassette player module and a printer module were developed. Despite reluctance to develop screen-based functionality that might bring RDS into competition with television, the utility of being able to print out information such as weather maps or even advertising was regarded as potentially interesting to both radio and television manufacturers alike.

Enhancements to the alternative frequencies functionality were added to the standard and it was subsequently published as a European Committee for Electrotechnical Standardization (CENELEC) standard in 1990.

In 1992 the U.S. National Radio Systems Committee issued the North American version of the RDS standard, called the Radio Broadcast Data System. The CENELEC standard was updated in 1992 with the addition of Traffic Message Channel and in 1998 with Open Data Applications and, in 2000, RDS was published worldwide as IEC standard 62106.

RDS2 
The RDS-Forum (Geneva/CH) decided at its annual meeting (8–9 June 2015) in Glion/Montreux to bring the new standard RDS2 on the way. The standard will be created in close collaboration with U.S. colleagues from NRSC RBDS-Subcommittee and should offer a unified platform for FM broadcasting and data services worldwide. 

Key features
 Seamless support for frequencies from 64 MHz to 108 MHz (AF, EON)
 New character coding: UTF-8 (old EBU Charset remains for compatibility mode for the old 0A/2A Groups).
 New ODA handling, "B" groups are assigned as signalling group to the "A" groups.
 Long PS-Name, up to 32 byte with UTF-8 character set. (Indian, Chinese, Arabic, and more)
 RadioText (eRT) 128 byte long with UTF-8 character set.
 Increased capacity from 11.4 up to 57 "A"-groups per second. (2,109 bit/s. net capacity with the single modulation-type multiple subcarriers (SMMS) technology)
 Graphical RadioText – supports HTML/CSS templates (for smartphones, car radios, computers/tablets)
 Supports return channel over gRT if the receiver has IP or SMS capability.
 Broadcaster's graphical logo – a maximum 4 kilobyte picture (JPEG, PNG, or GIF)
 Hybrid Radio feature (partly based on Radio France development)

Content and implementation

The following information fields are normally contained in the RDS data:
AF (alternative frequencies list) This provides the receiver with a list of frequencies that allows a receiver to re-tune to a different frequency providing the same station when the first signal becomes too weak (e.g., when moving out of range). Before performing the switch, a radio will check for a matching PI code to ensure the AF is the same station. This is often used in car stereo systems, allowing the head unit to automatically tune into the stronger signal on the move, optionally with the same regional code (so that, in the case of national broadcasting stations, the user can keep listening to the original radio program).
CT (clock time and date) Can synchronize a clock in the receiver or the main clock in a car. Due to transmission vagaries, CT can only be accurate to within 100 ms of UTC. CT is not usually transmitted if a broadcaster has no way to regularly synchronise the clock within the RDS encoder.
EON (enhanced other networks information) Informs the receiver about other networks or stations, linked to the one being listened to, for dynamically changing data such as the TA flag turning on for a particular station of the network in a particular moment due to a traffic programme being broadcast, and automatically and temporarily allows the radio to tune into that station.
PI (programme identification)This is the unique 4 character hexadecimal code that identifies the station. Every station in a country should use a unique 3 character code with the correct country prefix character. In the US, PI is determined by applying a formula to the station's call sign, or randomly assigned by the NRSC to FM translators (which have a longer call sign, making them incompatible with the formula). The PI code is the most important RDS parameter and the most frequently transmitted within the RDS data structure. The RDS standard for non US use defines country codes for all countries so that no where with common borders has the same code. This removes the need to coordinate codes between different countries. Any transmission that carries the same code is considered by receivers to be the same and can be switched to as an alternative frequency to improve reception (even if it is not specifically listed as an alternative frequency).
PS (programme service name) This is simply an eight-character static display that represents the call letters or station identity name. Most RDS capable receivers display this information and, if the station is stored in the receiver's presets, will cache this information with the PI code, frequency and other details associated with that preset. In some countries, stations use the PS to dynamically send other information. This is prohibited in some countries and was not its intended use within the RDS system.
PTY (programme type) This coding of up to 31 pre-defined programme types (e.g., in Europe: PTY1 News, PTY6 Drama, PTY11 Rock music) allows users to find similar programming by genre. PTY31 is reserved for emergency announcements in the event of natural disasters or other major calamities.
REG (regional) This is mainly used in countries where national broadcasters run "region-specific" programming such as regional opt-outs on some of their transmitters. This functionality allows the user to "lock-down" the set to their current region or let the radio tune into other region-specific programming as they move into the other region.
RT (radio text) This function allows a radio station to transmit a 64 (or less commonly 32) character free-form text message that can be either static (such as station slogans) or in sync with the programming (such as the title and artist of the currently playing song). 
RT+ (radio text plus) An enhancement of the original RT which allows Artist, Title and some other metadata to be sent to receivers.
TA, TP (traffic announcement, traffic programme)The receiver can often be set to pay special attention to this flag (taking advantage of the EON linkage if it's available) and, for example, pause a CD or retune to receive a traffic bulletin. The TP flag is used to allow the user to find only those stations that regularly broadcast traffic bulletins whereas the TA flag is used to signal an actual traffic bulletin in progress, with radio units perhaps performing other actions such as pausing a CD/MP3 (so the radio can be heard) or raising the volume during the traffic bulletin.
TMC (traffic message channel) Digitally encoded traffic information. Not all RDS equipment supports this, but it is often available for automotive navigation systems. In many countries only encrypted traffic data is broadcast, and so an appropriate decoder, possibly tied to a subscription service, is required to use the traffic data. The subscription is often paid by the vehicle manufacturer and is therefore transparent to the user.
US NRSC FM Translator Announcements The National Radio Systems Committee has introduced a unique Radio Data System Program Identification code for US FM translators. One type of metadata transmitted by RDS subcarrier is the PI code, which is used by the receiver to uniquely identify the audio program being broadcast by the FM station. In the U.S., the PI code has historically been derived from a radio station's call sign, which can become complicated when used in conjunction with FM translators. A new algorithm just for FM translators has been created that assigns a unique PI code to each FM translator. This algorithm has been implemented using a web-based tool and a list of all known PI codes for all FM translators in the US.

RDS support
As far as implementation is concerned, most car stereos will support at least AF, EON, REG, PS and TA/TP.

 More expensive car stereos will offer TMC, RT and / or PTY, perhaps with "NEWS" override.
 Home systems, especially hi-fi receivers, will mainly support functions like PS, RT and PTY.

There are a growing number of RDS implementations in portable audio and navigation devices thanks to lower-priced, small-footprint solutions.

RDS compatibility
The RDS sub-carrier at 57 kHz occupies ±2 kHz of the composite spectrum which in theory keeps it above the upper cutoff of the stereo subcarrier at 53 kHz. However the 53 kHz cutoff is entirely dependent on the performance of the 15 kHz low pass filters used before the stereo encoder. In older equipment, these filters were only designed to protect the 19 kHz pilot and sometimes did not provide sufficient protection to the RDS subcarrier when a significant amount of stereo information was present. In this situation, stereo enhancement devices combined with aggressive audio processing could render the RDS subcarrier unreceivable.

Composite clipping systems may also degrade the RDS sub-carrier because of the harmonics created by the clipping. More modern composite clippers include filtering to protect the RDS subcarrier.

The RDS subcarrier typically uses 2–4 kHz of carrier deviation. Therefore, the deviation available for the program material is reduced by this amount, assuming the usual 75 kHz deviation limit is not exceeded.

Program types
The following table lists the RDS and RBDS (North American) program type (PTY) codes and their meanings:

{| class="wikitable"
|+Program type (PTY) code assignment
!PTY code  	||RDS program type      	||RBDS program type
|rowspan=17|
!PTY code  	||RDS program type      	||RBDS program type
|-
|0	||colspan=2|No programme type or undefined
|16	||Weather 		||Rhythm and blues
|-
|1	||News	||News
|17	||Finance 		||Soft rhythm and blues
|-
|2	||Current affairs||Information
|18	||Children's programmes||Language
|-
|3	||Information 	||Sports
|19	||Social affairs||Religious music
|-
|4	||Sport			||Talk
|20	||Religion	||Religious talk
|-
|5	||Education 	||Rock
|21	||Phone-in	||Personality
|-
|6	||Drama 		||Classic rock
|22	||Travel 		||Public
|-
|7	||Culture 		||Adult hits
|23	||Leisure 		||College
|-
|8	||Science 		||Soft rock
|24	||Jazz music 	||Spanish Talk
|-
|9	||Varied 		||Top 40
|25	||Country music ||Spanish Music
|-
|10	||Pop music	||Country
|26	||National music	||Hip hop
|-
|11	||Rock music	||Oldies
|27	||Oldies music	||rowspan=2 bgcolor=lightgrey|Unassigned
|-
|12	||Easy listening	||Soft music
|28	||Folk music
|-
|13	||Light classical||Nostalgia
|29	||Documentary 	||Weather
|-
|14	||Serious classical||Jazz
|30	||Alarm test 	||Emergency test
|-
|15	||Other music 	||Classical
|31	||Alarm			||Emergency
|}

The PTY codes have undergone several expansions. The first RDS standard only defined 0–15 and 31. The later RBDS standard implemented in the U.S. assigned the same meanings to codes 0, 1 and 31, but made no attempt to match the rest of the original RDS plan and created its own list for codes 2–22 and 30, including commercially important (in the U.S.) radio formats such as top 40, religious, country, jazz and R&B which were not in the RDS list. This included mismatched codes for information. sport, and rock. Later RBDS standards added types 23 (College) and 29 (Weather), while the RDS type code list grew to its current size, importing some types (e.g. jazz and country) from the RDBS list. RDBS types 24–26 were added in April 2011. The code mismatches are mainly a problem for people taking portable radios into or out of North America.

RDS technical specification 
The RDS standard as specified in EN 50067:1998 is separated into these sections according to the OSI model. (The network and transport layers are excluded, as this is a unidirectional broadcast standard.)
 Data channel (Physical layer)
 Baseband coding (Data-link layer)
 Message format (Session and presentation layer)

Data channel (Physical layer) 
The physical layer in the standard describes how the bitstream is retrieved from the radio signal. The RDS hardware first demodulates the 57 kHz RDS subcarrier signal to extract a differential Manchester encoded signal which contains both the bit clock and the differentially encoded bitstream. This allows the RDS decoder to tolerate phase inversion of its input.

Baseband coding (Data-link layer) 
At the data link layer, 26 consecutive bits form a "block", consisting of 16 data bits followed by 10 error correction bits. Four blocks make a 104-bit "group". The error correction bits also encode the "offset", or block number within a 4-block group.

The error correction is done using a 10-bit cyclic redundancy check, with polynomial . (Neither a preset nor post-invert is used, as they are not necessary with a fixed-size data field.) The CRC is also summed with one of five "offset" words which identify the block: A, B, C, C′, or D. Four consecutive blocks (ABCD or ABC′D) make up a "group" of 104 bits (64 data bits + 40 check bits). There are slightly over 11.4 groups transmitted per second.

There is no gap between blocks. The receiver synchronizes to groups and blocks by checking CRCs on each 26 bits until synchronization is achieved. Once synchronized (the offset word is predictable), the code is capable of correcting up to 5-bit burst errors.

This basic modulation and block structure was originally developed for the  "mobile search" protocol, with the difference that MBS (or the North American equivalent MMBS "modified MBS") does not use an offset word. To allow the two systems to interoperate (and to allow FM radio stations to transmit RBDS data while maintaining their pager contracts), the RBDS standard defines a sixth all-zero offset word E. Groups of four E blocks may be mixed with RBDS groups, and ignored by RBDS receivers. (Likewise, the RBS offset words are chosen to appear as uncorrectable errors to MBS receivers.)

Data within each block (and group) is transmitted most significant bit first, and thus are numbered from bit 15 (transmitted first) to bit 0 (transmitted last).

The most frequently information transmitted is a 16-bit "program identification" code, identifying the transmitting radio station. Blocks A and C′ always include the PI code; offset C is used when the third block contains something else.

Shared structure 
Block 1 always contains the 16-bit program identifier. The first 11 bits (bits 15–5) of block 2 are also the same in all groups.

The first 4 bits (bits 15–11) of block 2 are the "group type code", which describe the interpretation of the remaining data. Each group type comes "A" and "B" variants, distinguished by the fifth "B" bit (bit 10): If B=0, then the group is 0A through 15A, and contains 5+16+16 = 37 bits of data. If B=1, block 2 contains a PI code (and is encoded with offset word C′), the group is one of 0B through 15B, and contains 21 bits of data.

Within Block 1 and Block 2 are structures that will always be present in both group versions, for fast and responsive identifications. The first block of every group, will always be the program identification code. The second block dedicates the first 4 bits for Application/Group Type.

Meaning of Block 2 Bits
 GTYPE: Group Type 
 B0: If B0=0 then Message Group Type A else Type B
 TP: Traffic Program. Indicates this channel includes periodic traffic reports.
 PTY: Program Type (See .)
 ????: Rest of the bits are group type dependent

Message version A

Message version B 
Block 3 is used for repeating program identification code.

Program identification code (PI code) 
This allows for quick identification of radio program type, based on country, coverage area, and program reference number. While the country code is specified by the standard, bit 11 to bit 0 is specified by each country local authorities.

Country codes are re-used, but only in geographically distant regions beyond FM broadcast range from each other. For example, country code F is assigned to France, Norway, Belarus and Egypt.

Group type 
This is a short list of the full group type. Each group type may have a secondary version available

Traffic Program 
This can be considered an additional program type bit, and indicates that the station broadcasts periodic traffic reports. By including it in every group, a receiver can quickly search for a station which includes traffic reports.

Another bit, traffic announcement (TA), is sent in block types 0A, 0B and 15B to indicate that such a report is in progress. It is common for otherwise-simulcast transmitters to have periodic local traffic reports which are customized to the individual transmitter. The traffic announcement bit tells a receiver that a transmitter-specific broadcast is in progress, and it should avoid switching frequencies while they are in progress.

(There is a different form of traffic announcement bit in block type 14B, which indicates the presence of a traffic announcement on a different frequency, so that radio receivers can automatically switch.)

RDS message examples 
These are non-comprehensive examples that cover just the simple messages likes station name, radio text, and date/time.

Group type 0 – Version B – Station name 

As we have already described previous fields above, these dot points below show just the application specific fields.
 TA : Traffic Announcement
 M/S : Music/Speech
The station name and decoder identification code is sent progressively over 4 groups, where the offset is defined by bit C1 and C0.

Group type 2 – Radio text 

As we have already described previous fields above, these dot points below show just the application specific fields.
 A/B : Text A/B flag is used to detect if a screen clear is requested.
 C3 to C0 : Is the text segment offset value
The station name and decoder identification code is sent progressively over 4 groups, where the offset is defined by bit C1 and C0.

Group type 4 – Version A – Clock time and data 

When group type 4A is used, it shall be transmitted every minute according to EN 50067.

The clock time group is inserted so that the minute edge will occur within ±0.1 seconds of the end of the clock time group.

Time and date are packed as these:

Note: The local time offset is expressed in multiples of half hours within the range −15.5h to +15.5h. It is expressed in signed magnitude form, with the most significant bit being the "Local Offset Sign" bit (LOS), 0 = + (east of Greenwich), 1 = −.

Example RDS usage
The following three images illustrate how RDS can be used on an FM radio station; the latter two were taken when the radio was tuned to Nottingham radio station Trent FM. All the images are of the display on the Sony XDR-S1 DAB/FM/MW/LW portable radio.

RDS decoder chipsets

Companies such as ST Microelectronics, Silicon Labs in Austin, Texas and NXP Semiconductors (formerly Philips) offer single-chip solutions that are found in these devices.

See also

High-level RDS APIs 
 Advanced Multimedia Supplements (JSR-234) (in Java programming language)
 OpenMAX AL (in C programming language)

Related technologies
 ALERT FM – RBDS emergency notification system
 HEARO – a defunct RBDS emergency notification system
 Data Radio Channel (DARC)
 DirectBand
 Program and System Information Protocol
 UECP – protocol (Universal Encoder Communication Protocol)
 RDS OF THINGS – Using RDS in Smart City applications.

Related topics
 Digital radio
 Error correction
 FM broadcasting
 Internet radio device
 Modem
 Radio receiver
 Teletext – ≈6.5kbit/s data transmission over Analog TV channel

Notes

References
 The Directory of European FM Broadcasting, European FM Handbook 2002–2003, 13th edition, published July 1, 2002, B5 format,  
 Dietmar Kopitz, Bev Marks, RDS: Radio Data System (Mobile Communications Library),  
 MSB VMA report, 
 http://www.interactive-radio-system.com/docs/EN50067_RDS_Standard.pdf
  (31 pages)

External links
 FARWAY IRFC, TV and Radio Transmission , Radio Data System Encoders
 Specification of the RDS standard, available via the RDS Forum
 "NRSC-4 National Radio Systems Committee United States RBDS Standard – Specification of the radio broadcast data system (RBDS)"
 The RDS Forum is the professional association of the users of the Radio Data System broadcast technology
 RDS: "The Radio Data System", "The Broadcasters Guide to RDS"
 RDS Features Serving as Tuning Aids
 xRDS "Extending the RDS data transmission capacity"
 "xRDS presentation at the RDS Forum meeting 2011"
 RDSList.com
 GR-RDS on Github – A GNU Radio-based open source implementation of an RDS receiver and transmitter
 Decoding RDS TMC program and circuit
 FM Broadcast and TV Broadcast Aural Subcarriers – Clifton Laboratories

1984 establishments
1984 introductions
British inventions
Broadcast engineering
Digital radio
German inventions
Radio technology